Ou Est Le Swimming Pool were an English synthpop group from Camden, London, made up of Caan Capan, Charles Haddon, and Joe Hutchinson.

The band name is an amalgamation of French (où est le: where is the) and English (swimming pool) and is inspired by a line from French teacher Mrs. Crabbe (played by Pam Ferris) in the television series Hardwicke House. They released four singles.

History
In 2009, the band released and re-released their debut single, "Dance the Way I Feel", before supporting La Roux on their UK tour. In 2010, the band released the singles "These New Knights", "Jackson's Last Stand" and "The Key" as well as their debut album The Golden Year.

The band played at Glastonbury Festival and Bestival in 2009 and supported La Roux on their tour in early 2010. In May 2010, they played at Evolution Festival and in July at Global Gathering, along with a series of festivals all over Europe throughout the summer of 2010.

They appear on Tiësto's fifth album A Town Called Paradise on the song "The Feeling".

Charles Haddon's death and disbandment
On 20 August 2010, Charles Haddon, the lead singer of the band, died after a performance at Pukkelpop, Belgium. He died by suicide in the backstage artists' parking area. Haddon was reported to have been distressed after he feared he had seriously injured a young girl earlier after a stage dive. Haddon was 22 years old.

On 3 October 2010, the remaining Ou Est Le Swimming Pool members arranged a festival, billed as Chazzstock, in honour of Haddon at Koko in Camden, London. The Kooks, Mr Hudson, Tony Hadley of Spandau Ballet, Man Like Me, Daisy Dares You, Kissy Sell Out, Tribes, Ollie Wride and The Horrors performed at the event. The event raised more than £8,000 for charities Mind and Campaign Against Living Miserably (CALM). Faris Badwan of The Horrors also dedicated his side-project Cat's Eyes' debut album Cat's Eyes to Haddon's memory.

Discography

Album

Singles

References

External links
 Ou Est le Swimming Pool on Myspace

2009 establishments in England
2010 disestablishments in England
English synth-pop groups
Musical groups disestablished in 2010
Musical groups established in 2009
Musical groups from the London Borough of Camden
British musical trios
Stiff Records artists